Mr. Toad, of Toad Hall, is one of the main characters in the 1908 novel The Wind in the Willows by Kenneth Grahame, and also the title character of the 1929 A. A. Milne play Toad of Toad Hall based on the book.

Inspiration
The inspiration for Mr. Toad's wayward mischievousness and boastfulness was Kenneth Grahame's only child Alastair: a family friend, Constance Smedley, overheard Grahame telling Alastair the exploits of Toad as a bedtime story, and noted that "Alastair's own tendency to exult in his exploits was gently satirized in Mr. Toad". Colonel Francis Cecil Ricardo (1852–1924), the first owner of a car in Cookham in Berkshire, where Grahame wrote the books is also thought to have been an influence. Other suggestions include Walter Cunliffe, 1st Baron Cunliffe.

Actors who have played Mr. Toad
 Eric Blore - The Adventures of Ichabod and Mr. Toad
 David Jason - The Wind in the Willows (1983 film)
 Charles Nelson Reilly - The Wind in the Willows (1987 film)
 Rik Mayall - The Wind in the Willows (1995 film)
 Terry Jones - The Wind in the Willows (1996 film)
 Matt Lucas - The Wind in the Willows (2006 film)
 Peter Harryson - on stage.

References in other media
The first story arc of the Batman and Robin comic book by Grant Morrison features a villainous character with the name and appearance of Mr. Toad. After Batman and Robin interrogate Toad, he is revealed to be in cahoots with Pyg.

References

Anthropomorphic amphibians
Fictional frogs
Characters in children's literature
Characters in British novels of the 20th century
Literary characters introduced in 1908